Kalkatungic is a branch of the Pama–Nyungan family,

Kalkatungu, 
Yalarnnga.

The two languages are not close; Dixon treats them as separate families.  A Wakabunga language is often included based on a word list that turned out to be mislabeled Kalkatungu.

Footnotes

References
Dixon, R. M. W. 2002. Australian Languages: Their Nature and Development. Cambridge University Press

 
Indigenous Australian languages in Queensland